Alexandr Dolgopolov was the defending champion, but he chose to compete in 2010 International German Open instead.
Pablo Andújar won the tournament, beating Édouard Roger-Vasselin 6–4, 6–3 in the final.

Seeds

Draw

Finals

Top half

Bottom half

References

Trofeo Bellaveglia - Singles
Orbetello Challenger